Easy Winners is an album by American jazz drummer Max Roach recorded in 1985 for the Italian Soul Note label.

Reception
The Allmusic review by Scott Yanow awarded the album 4½ stars stating "The wide variety of colors and the consistently-strong improvisations make this a highly recommended set of stirring music".

Track listing
 "Bird Says" (Cecil Bridgewater) - 12:48 
 "Sis" (Odean Pope) - 6:33 
 "A Little Booker" (Max Roach) - 13:50 
 "Easy Winners" (Scott Joplin) - 4:54 
Recorded at the Platinum Factory in Brooklyn, New York on January 4, 7-8, 1985

Personnel
Max Roach - drums
Cecil Bridgewater - trumpet
Odean Pope - tenor saxophone
John McLaughlin Williams, Cecelia Hobbs - violin
Maxine Roach - viola
Eileen Folson - cello
Tyrone Brown - electric bass
Ray Mantilla - percussion (track 1)

References

Black Saint/Soul Note albums
Max Roach albums
1985 albums